"That Old Pair of Jeans" is a song by English electronic music producer Fatboy Slim, released on 26 June 2006 as a single from his greatest hits album The Greatest Hits – Why Try Harder. It features vocals from American rapper Lateef the Truth Speaker.

Track listing 

 CD

 7"

 12"

Music video 

Fatboy Slim commissioned comedian and juggler Chris Bliss to perform to the song in front of a live theatre audience for a music video. The video expanded into a MySpace contest to "Juggle to music like Chris Bliss". The entries were narrowed down to eleven entries including one non-juggling entry directed by Steve Glashier featuring Australian hula-hooper Angie Mack (née Humphries). John Augustus "Gus" Tate won the competition and Angie Mack received honourable mention as the "Non-Juggling Winner" as the video so impressed Fatboy Slim.

Charts

References 

2006 singles
Fatboy Slim songs
Songs written by Norman Cook
Astralwerks singles
2006 songs
Skint Records singles